Deh Gazi (also Romanized as Deh Gazī) is a village in Khatunabad Rural District, in the Central District of Jiroft County, Kerman Province, Iran. As of the 2006 census, its population was 64, in 15 families.

References 

Populated places in Jiroft County